Crescent was launched at Rotherhithe in 1790. She initially traded with the Levant, particularly Smyrna. After the outbreak of war with France she may have tried her hand as a privateer. In 1796–1798 she made a voyage to the East Indies, almost surely on behalf of the British East India Company (EIC). A French privateer captured her but the British Royal Navy quickly recaptured her. In 1802-1804 she made one voyage as a slave ship carrying slaves from West Africa to Jamaica. In 1805 she became a whaler. She was lost in 1807 off Patagonia while homeward bound from her first whaling voyage.

Career
Crescent enters Lloyd's Register in 1790 with J. Moring, master, St Barbe, owner, and trade London–Straits (of Gibraltar). subsequent volumes of Lloyd's Register refer to her trade as being London–Smyrna.

On 6 March 1793 Captain James Moring acquired a letter of marque. War with France had commenced in February and the size of Crescents crew is consistent with her sailing as a privateer. In 1793 she had damages repaired.

Lloyd's Register for 1798 shows Crescents master changing from J. Moring to J. Elsmere, and her trade from Falmouth–Smyrna to London–East Indies. Captain John Ellesmere acquired a letter of marque on 9 June 1796.

Because the EIC had a monopoly on trade with the East, on her voyage to the East Indies Crescent was probably sailing on its behalf, or for the British government. Currently there is no readily available information to settle the question.

On 17 June 1798 the French 16-gun privateer Mercure captured Crescent as Crescent was returning to London from China. However, on 29 June the frigate  recaptured Crescent. Crescent was brought into Falmouth.

Lloyd's Register for 1798 shows Crescents master changing from Lesmere to S. Brown, and her trade from London–East Indies to London–Jamaica. There also appears to have been a change in ownership, but the name of the new owner is illegible. The volume for 1799 makes it clear that the new owner was Shedden & Co.

Slave ship
On 11 June 1801 Captain William Chapman acquired a letter of marque. The Register of Shipping for 1802 shows her master changing from Chapman to A. Cowan, her owner from Capt. & Co. to Throckmorton, and her trade from London–Demerara to London–Africa.

Captain Alexander Cowen sailed from London 13 September 1802. Crescent arrived at West Africa and started gathering slaves at Cape Coast Castle 8 December. She sailed from Africa on 29 May 1803 and arrived at Kingston, Jamaica, on 4 August. She had embarked 267 slaves and she landed 240 for a loss rate of 10.1%. She sailed from Jamaica 18 November, and arrived at London on 29 January 1804.

Whaler
John Mather, Matthew Heathfield, Thomas Hopper, Thomas Mather, and Richard Heathfield purchased Crescent in 1805. She then underwent a thorough repair. The Register of Shipping for 1806 shows Hopper, master, Mather, owner, and trade London-South.
 
Crescent, Captain Thomas Hopper, sailed from England on 6 March 1805, bound for Peru. She was off the coast of Peru in July. 28 February 1806 she was "all well" off the Galápagos Islands. She was again "all well" of the coast of Peru in July. On 14 December she was around Cape Horn, bound for London.

Fate
Crescent foundered off Patagonia on 8 March 1807. Edward, of Nantucket, rescued the crew.

Notes, citations, and references
Notes

Citations

References
Clayton, Jane M. (2014) Ships employed in the South Sea Whale Fishery from Britain: 1775-1815: An alphabetical list of ships. (Berforts Group). 

1790 ships
Ships built in Rotherhithe
Ships of the British East India Company
Captured ships
London slave ships
Whaling ships
Maritime incidents in 1807
Shipwrecks in the Atlantic Ocean